Mithya is an Indian Hindi-language, psychological thriller drama web series streaming on ZEE5. It is directed by Rohan Sippy and produced by Applause Entertainment and Rose Audio Visual Production. This six-episode web series was released on 18 February 2022. It stars with Huma Qureshi, Avantika Dassani, Parambrata Chatterjee, Rajit Kapur and Samir Soni in pivotal roles. The series is adapted from the British television show Cheat! Avantika Dassani made her acting debut with this series. The drama was exclusively shot in St. Paul's School, Darjeeling

Summary 
Set against the picturesque backdrop of Darjeeling, this is a dark and twisted tale of truth and deception laced with numerous secrets and lies. It all starts when Juhi Adhikari, a righteous Hindi Literature professor, accuses her student, Rhea Rajguru of plagiarism in her Literature essay.

Rhea, who is the daughter of one of the top college benefactors doesn’t take this well and sets out on a journey of vengeance and violence, destroying everything in her path. What happens when an obsessed and impulsive Rhea turns Juhi’s world upside down is what follows the rest of the story.

Cast 

 Huma Qureshi as Juhi Adhikari; Hindi professor
 Avantika Dassani as Rhea Rajguru; student
 Parambrata Chatterjee as Neil Adhikari; Juhi's husband
 Rajit Kapur as Anand Tyagi; father of Juhi
 Avantika Akerkar as Sudha; mother of Juhi
 Samir Soni as Rajguru, father of Rhea
 Indraneil Sengupta as Vishal
 Naina Sareen as Sharmistha

Release 
ZEE5 announced the launch of a trailer on 8 February 2021 and the series was released on 18 February 2022.

Reception

Critical reviews 
The series opened to mixed to positive reviews.
Archika Khurana of The Times of India has given 3/5 stars stating that Huma Qureshi and Avantika Dassani's intense performances make this psychodrama an addictive thriller. All the actors made justice with their characters in terms of performance. The Darjeeling's picturesque grandeur, with overcast rains, weather, and the greenery of the Himalayan foothills, added beauty to the screenplay. The background score is effective.

Devarsi Ghosh of Hindustan Times stated that the web series should have been a tight little naughty 90-minute murder mystery. Instead of a stretched 180-minute which is the nearly same length as the British series Cheat. Series direction was in a state of nervous excitement, and anything with emotional gravity will drag Sippy down. It is watchable because of the actors' performances.

Shubhra Gupta of The Indian Express stated that Huma Qureshi and Avantika Dassani thriller locks in long-term guilt, and a burning desire for revenge makes it great companions for a story like this one. The tale of fatal attractions leaves us poised on an uneasy cliff-hanger and interested for another season.

References

External links 

 Mithya at ZEE5
 

Indian drama web series
ZEE5 original programming
2022 web series debuts